Afrospilarctia is a genus of tiger moths in the family Erebidae and are found in the Afrotropics.

Species
 Afrospilarctia dentivalva Dubatolov, 2011
 Afrospilarctia dissimilis (Distant, 1897)
 Afrospilarctia flavidus (Bartel, 1903)
 Afrospilarctia lucida (Druce, 1898)
 Afrospilarctia unipuncta (Hampson, 1905)

References

Spilosomina
Moth genera